Lemonia is a genus of moths in the family Brahmaeidae (older classifications placed it in the separate family Lemoniidae.

Species

Lemonia balcanica (Herrich-Schäffer, 1847)
Lemonia ballioni (Christoph, 1888)
Lemonia beirutica Daniel, 1965
Lemonia dumi (Linnaeus, 1761)
Lemonia pauli Staudinger, 1894
Lemonia peilei Rothschild, 1921
Lemonia peilei farsica Wiltshire, 1946
Lemonia peilei klapperichi Wiltshire, 1961 (Turkmenistan)
Lemonia peilei peilei
Lemonia peilei talhouki Wiltshire, 1952
Lemonia philopalus Donzel, 1842
Lemonia pia Püngeler, 1902
Lemonia pia friedeli Witt, 1979
Lemonia pia pia
Lemonia ponticus (Aurivillius, 1894)
Lemonia sacrosancta Püngeler, 1902
Lemonia sardanapalus Staudinger, 1887 (Turkmenistan)
Lemonia strigata Rebel, 1910
Lemonia taraxaci (Denis & Schiffermüller, 1775)
Lemonia vallantini Oberthür, 1890

References

External links
Fauna Europaea

Brahmaeidae